Walerand may refer to:

Walerand Teutonicus, Lord Warden of the Cinque Ports in 1235
Robert Walerand (died 1273), was justiciar of England